Thören is a village on the southern edge of the Lüneburg Heath, Lower Saxony, Germany.

Thoren, Thören (German) and Thorén (Swedish) may also refer to:

People 
Arne Thorén (1927–2003), Swedish journalist and diplomat
Jens Thorén, Swedish former Magic: The Gathering player
Johanna Thorén (1889–1969), Norwegian elected official and business owner
Marcus Thorén (born 1971), Swedish taekwondo practitioner
Michele Thoren Bond (born 1953), American diplomat
Per Thorén (1885–1962), Swedish figure skater
Petra Thorén (born 1969), Finnish tennis player
Skip Thoren (born 1943), American basketball player
Sverker Thorén (born 1955), Swedish politician
Torgil Thorén (1892–1982), Swedish Navy officer

Fictional characters 

Thoren (elf), in the animated TV show The Secret World of Santa Claus
Thoren, in the animated series Winx Club

See also 

 Thoran

Swedish-language surnames